The Spaans Lagoen (Spanish lagoon) is a wetland and protected area of Aruba. It has been designated a Ramsar site since 1980. It is the only inner bay of Aruba, and has been formed during the last ice age. It contains tidal mudflats and mangrove swamps, and is an importance feeding and breeding ground for birds. The Spaans Lagoen is adjacent to and part of the Arikok National Park.

Overview
Spaans Lagoen is a lagoon which is about two kilometres long and 200 to 500 metres wide. The tidal influence on the lagoon has resulted in a rare ecosystem. Its shores are covered in mangroves. The area is an importance feeding and breeding ground for birds, and a nursery for reef fish and crustaceans. Palm Island is located at the mouth of the Spaans Lagoen. The Frenchman's Pass is located to the north.

Bridge

The lagoon is located halfway between the Queen Beatrix International Airport and the town of San Nicolaas. The Green Corridor was constructed in 2016 to provide better access to San Nicolaas. The construction included a bridge over the Spaans Lagoen. During the bridge construction, a part of the mangrove forest was damaged. It was decided to build an S-shaped canal in order to compensate for the damage and allow for the regeneration of the mangroves.

References

Geography of Aruba
Protected areas of Aruba